San Giovanni al Natisone is a comune (municipality) in the Province of Udine in the Italian region Friuli-Venezia Giulia, located about  northwest of Trieste and about  southeast of Udine.

San Giovanni al Natisone borders the following municipalities: Chiopris-Viscone, Cormons, Corno di Rosazzo, Manzano, Trivignano Udinese.

Twin towns
 Francavilla Fontana, Italy
 Kuchl, Austria

References

External links
 Official website

Cities and towns in Friuli-Venezia Giulia